In 2009 State Library of Queensland, the Queensland Library Foundation and the QUT Business School collaborated to establish the Queensland Business Leaders Hall of Fame (QBLHOF) initiative. The Queensland Business Leaders Hall of Fame recognises the outstanding 'public contribution made by leaders of business to the reputation of Queensland and its economic and social development'

The inductees are announced at an annual Induction Dinner gala event each year.

Criteria 
A governing committee determines a list of inductees based on a set of criteria including:
 Sustained leadership
 Major financial contribution
 Pioneering
 Outstanding contribution
 Achievement of iconic status
Other factors assessing criteria may include:
 Length of service or period of leadership 
 Number of employees or employment opportunities generated 
 Innovation in the field or significance of industry/service development

List of Inductees 
The inductees are:

Fellowship 
Since 2014 the QBLHOF has also awarded an annual Fellowship, to recipients working on a research project that utilises the resources of the John Oxley Library at State Library of Queensland to produce new interpretations of Queensland's business history.

List of Fellowship winners

References

Attribution 

Business organisations based in Australia
Businesspeople from Queensland
Businesspeople halls of fame
Halls of fame in Australia
Awards established in 2009